Atlético Lusitania was a Peruvian football club, playing in the city of Barrios Altos, Lima District, Lima, Peru.

History
The club was founded on the Barrios Altos, Lima District, Lima. The club was promoted to the Segunda Division Peruana upon winning the championship in the Regional League of Lima after defeating to the Unión Callao, KDT Nacional, Juventud Gloria, Association Chorrillos, Unión Carbone, Porvenir Miraflores and Juventud Peru. The club was the runner-up in the Segunda División Peruana 1945, 1951, and 1953.

Honours

National
Peruvian Segunda Division:
Runner-up (3): 1945, 1951, 1953

División Intermedia:
Winners (1): 1937

Regional
Liga Regional de Lima y Callao:
Winners (1): 1944
Runner-up (1): 1943

Liga Distrital de Cercado de Lima:
Winners (1): 1979

See also
List of football clubs in Peru
Peruvian football league system

External links
 Peru 2nd Division Champions (Lima)

Football clubs in Peru